Elroy Bert Coan III (July 2, 1940 – February 19, 2022) was an American football player. He is most notable because of his extraordinary speed (9.4 in the 100-yard dash) and size.

Career
Coan was the central figure in a dispute over the 1960 college football game between the University of Kansas Jayhawks and the University of Missouri Tigers, the second-longest-running rivalry in college football (known as the "Border War").

Coan played for Kansas - and helped the Jayhawks win the 1960 game by a score of 23-7 over Missouri, then-ranked #1.  But later, the Big Eight declared Coan ineligible, due to a recruiting violation by Bud Adams while Coan was still at Texas Christian University (TCU) and forfeited the game to Missouri—thus erasing Missouri's only loss on the field that year.  Missouri counts the 1960 game as a win by forfeit, thus giving it the only undefeated and untied season in school history. The Big Eight also credited the 1960 game to Missouri. However, Kansas (and the NCAA) count the game as a Kansas victory.  Ever since, the two universities have disputed the overall win–loss record in the long-running series.

Coan went on to play in 72 games in seven seasons in the American Football League; the first season with the San Diego Chargers, and the rest with the Kansas City Chiefs.

Coan died in Garrison, Texas, on February 19, 2022, at the age of 81.

References

External links
 

1940 births
2022 deaths
American football halfbacks
American Football League players
Kansas City Chiefs players
Kansas Jayhawks football players
San Diego Chargers players
TCU Horned Frogs football players
Pasadena High School (Pasadena, Texas) alumni
People from Timpson, Texas
Players of American football from Texas